The Nelson Museum was a small museum housed in a Grade II listed Georgian Merchant's house on South Quay in Great Yarmouth, Norfolk. It was formed from the collection of local agriculturalist Ben Burgess, who was a lifelong collector of Nelson related artefacts. Opened by the Duke of Edinburgh in 2002, the museum celebrated the life and times of Admiral Horatio Nelson. There were galleries, a new temporary exhibition every two years, and interactive exhibits and games for children.

The museum was forced to close in October 2019 due to declining visitor numbers and the withdrawal of funding by Great Yarmouth Borough Council. The collection, comprising over 2,000 items including an oil portrait of Nelson and some of his original letters, was put into storage.

See also
 National Maritime Museum

References

External links
 

Museums in Norfolk
Great Yarmouth
Biographical museums in Norfolk
Naval museums in England
Horatio Nelson